Kathleen Sullivan is an American television journalist.

She was hired as a news anchor for the newly founded news channel CNN in 1980, when she was 27 years old, and she has also worked for ABC News, CBS News, and The Huffington Post.

Early life and education
She was born in Pasadena, California and attended Santa Catalina School in Monterey, California.

Career

CNN
Starting her career in local television, she became the first female anchor hired by CNN in 1980.

She became the first American woman to broadcast live from the Soviet Union when she went there to interview Russian cosmonauts for the Soviet Pre-Olympic festival. In 1980, Sullivan was picked by Ted Turner to help launch his Cable News Network.

ABC News
Moving to ABC News, she debuted ABC World News This Morning with co-anchor Steve Bell in 1982, substituted for co-host Joan Lunden on Good Morning America, anchored ABC World News Saturday, and started the first national-network health program, The Health Show. During the 1980s, Sullivan reported live from party conference, summit, state funerals and the Olympic Games. She broadcast live from Buckingham Palace in London to report the list of royal weddings of Charles, Prince of Wales and Diana, Princess of Wales.

In 1984, Sullivan became the first woman to anchor a telecast of the Olympic Games. She was an in-studio anchor for ABC Olympic broadcasts during the 1984 Winter Olympics, held in Sarajevo, and later that year during the 1984 Summer Olympics, held in Los Angeles, California.

CBS News
In 1987, Sullivan moved to CBS News to become co-anchor with Harry Smith of CBS This Morning.  She served as co-anchor of the program from November 30, 1987 until February 23, 1990, after which she left CBS News.  During her time at CBS, Sullivan was the only American journalist invited by President of the United States Ronald Reagan to a 1987 White House state dinner honoring General Secretary of the Communist Party of the Soviet Union Mikhail Gorbachev and celebrating the end of the Cold War. Her reporting in 1989 on Hurricane Hugo in South Carolina won her and CBS News an Emmy Award for Outstanding Live Coverage of a Breaking News Event. On her firing from CBS Sullivan stated, "They called me old, unattractive and said, 'No one wants to look at her anymore,' " Sullivan told a reporter. "I broke a lot of news interviews, but that wasn't important to them."

NBC News
Kathleen Sullivan anchored the 1992 Summer Olympics, held in Barcelona, for NBC's pay-per-view Olympics Triplecast.

Radio
She has also worked in radio, doing weekly commentaries for ABC News and working in Los Angeles as a talk-show host on KABC and as a drive-time anchor for the all-news station KFWB, 1999-2000.

Later work
Sullivan was the host of two syndicated health shows in the 1990s.

In the mid-1990s, she appeared in television and magazine ads as a spokesperson for Weight Watchers.

E!
Sullivan received an Emmy nomination for Best Sportscaster – a first for a woman – and received two Emmy nominations for her work as anchor of E!'s E! News Daily, which she hosted after anchoring full-time coverage of the 1995 O. J. Simpson murder case.

Awards and honors
She has been nominated for Emmy Awards in news, sports and entertainment.

Memberships

Substance Abuse and Mental Health Services Administration advisory board member
Sullivan is a member of the National Advisory Board of the Substance Abuse and Mental Health Services Administration – a branch of the U.S. Department of Health and Human Services – to which she was appointed in 2003 by the U.S. Secretary of Health and Human Services Tommy Thompson.

In popular culture
She has made various cameo appearances as herself in various entertainment television programs including the episode "Millions from Heaven" (1996) of the television sitcom series Roseanne (1988–1997), reporting on the list of Roseanne and The Conners characters winning the lottery.

See also

List of CNN personnel
List of people from Pasadena, California

References

External links

1953 births
20th-century American women writers
21st-century American women writers
ABC News personalities
American bloggers
American radio news anchors
American talk radio hosts
American women radio presenters
American television news anchors
American television sports anchors
CBS News people
CNN people
HuffPost writers and columnists
E!
Emmy Award winners
Journalists from California
Living people
NBC News people
Olympic Games broadcasters
People from Pasadena, California
Radio personalities from Los Angeles
Women sports announcers
American women television journalists
American women columnists